Faune Alecia Chambers is an American actress and dancer, best known for her roles in the films White Chicks (2004), Bring It On Again (2004) and Epic Movie (2007).

Career
Chambers has had roles in the films White Chicks (2004) and Epic Movie (2007). She has also been featured in Austin Powers in Goldmember (2002), Breakin' All the Rules (2004), Bring It On Again (2004) and The Cutting Edge: Going for the Gold (2006). Her television appearances include Las Vegas, All of Us, The Game, Eve, and Psych. She is also featured in Trina and Tamara's music video "What'd You Come Here For?", Ne-Yo's music video for "Mad", Destiny's Child's Say My Name and Jennifer Lopez's "Feelin' So Good" video, as a dancer. She also danced for Janet Jackson in her music video for “Doesn’t Really Matter” as well as on stage with Michael Jackson in one of his “Dangerous” live performances in South Korea.

Filmography

Film and TV Movies

Television

Music Videos

References

External links
 

Spelman College alumni
American film actresses
American television actresses
Living people
20th-century American actresses
21st-century American actresses
African-American actresses
Actresses from Miami
Actresses from Virginia
1976 births
Dancers from Florida
Dancers from Virginia